The Deutsche Schillerstiftung (German Schiller Foundation), headquartered in Weimar, is the oldest private foundation for the assistance of writers in Germany, founded in 1855. It was refounded in 1995 as the Deutsche Schillerstiftung von 1859 (1859 German Schiller Foundation). It presents several awards and prizes for literary achievement and also since its foundation has assisted writers in financial emergencies or who are in need of support.

German literary awards